Sulpicius Gallus is a small, bowl-shaped lunar impact crater that lies near the southwestern edge of the Mare Serenitatis. The crater is named after the 2nd century BC Roman astronomer Gaius Sulpicius Gallus.

About 10 kilometers to the south and east is the Montes Haemus range that forms the edge of the Serenitatis basin. This crater has a relatively high albedo, with a sharp-edged rim that displays little appearance of wear. There is a small rise at the midpoint. Recent deposits of highland material have been observed within the crater interior. This material was observed to be orange by Apollo 17 astronauts during their LMP ascent 

To the northwest is a rille system designated the Rimae Sulpicius Gallus. These extend to the northwest for a distance of about 90 kilometers, curving and branching out to follow the edge of the mare.

Satellite craters

By convention these features are identified on lunar maps by placing the letter on the side of the crater midpoint that is closest to Sulpicius Gallus.

References

Further reading

External links

Sulpicius Gallus at The Moon Wiki
Rimae Sulpicius Gallus at The Moon Wiki
 LTO-42D4 Sulpicius Gallus — L&PI topographic map
  - the rille
  - both the crater and the rille
  - the rille

Impact craters on the Moon